The Eta Aquariids are a meteor shower associated with Halley's Comet.

The shower is visible from about April 19 to about May 28 each year with peak activity on or around May 5. Unlike most major annual meteor showers, there is no sharp peak for this shower, but rather a broad maximum with good rates that last approximately one week centered on May 5. The meteors we currently see as members of the Eta Aquariid shower separated from Halley's Comet hundreds of years ago. The current orbit of Halley's Comet does not pass close enough to the Earth to be a source of meteoric activity.

Although this shower is not as spectacular as the Leonids may be and well below the rates of the Perseids or the Geminids, it is not an ordinary event. The Eta Aquariids get their name because their radiant appears to lie in the constellation Aquarius, near one of the constellation's brightest stars, Eta Aquarii. The shower peaks at about a rate of around a meteor per minute, although such rates are rarely seen from northern latitudes due to the low altitude of the radiant.

The Eta Aquariids are best viewed in the pre-dawn hours away from the glow of city lights. For northern observers, the radiant of the shower is only above the horizon for the few hours before dawn, and early-rising observers are often rewarded with rates that climb as the radiant rises before sunrise. The shower is best viewed from the equator to 30 degrees south latitude.

The activity is fairly constant from one return to the next. However, in 2013, the maximum ZHR exceeded the average level significantly for about two days. An explanation was presented by Mikiya Sato
(Sato & Watanabe, 2013), showing that the meteoroids are from very old ejection from the parent 1P/Halley and are trapped probably in resonances to Jupiter's orbit (similar to the Orionids observed between 2007 and 2010). The peak ZHR reached 135 ± 16. Updated information on the expected time and rates of the shower is provided through the annual IMO Meteor Shower Calendar.

See also 
 List of Aquariid meteor showers

References

External links 
 Worldwide viewing times for the 2016 Eta Aquarids meteor shower
 Observing and History of the Eta Aquarids
 Detailed information on the 2011 maximum of the Eta Aquarids, courtesy of the International Meteor Organization
 Your Guide To Watching This Week's Halley's Comet Meteor Shower

April events
Halley's Comet
May events
Meteor showers